The XIX Top is a series of Swiss single-place paragliders, that was designed by Michi Kobler and produced by XIX GmbH of Kronbühl in the mid-2000s. It is now out of production.

Design and development
The Top was designed as a performance cross country glider. The design progressed through several generations of models, each improving on the last. The models are each named for their relative size.

Variants
Top 2 M
Mid-sized model for medium-weight pilots. The glider model is Deutscher Hängegleiterverband e.V. (DHV) 2-3 certified.
Top 2 L
Large-sized model for heavier pilots. The glider model is DHV 2-3 certified.

Specifications (Top 2 M)

References

Top
Paragliders